Zonaria is a genus of sea snails, marine gastropod molluscs in the family Cypraeidae, the cowries.

Species 
Species within the genus Zonaria include:
 Zonaria angolensis (Odhner, 1923)
Zonaria picta (Gray, 1824)
Zonaria pyrum (Gmelin, 1791)
Zonaria zonaria (Gmelin, 1791)

Extinct species
Extinct species within the genus Zonaria include:
† Zonaria angolensis (Odhner, 1923)
† Zonaria dertamygdaloides Sacco 1894
† Zonaria fabagina Lamarck 1810
† Zonaria heilprinii Dall 1890
† Zonaria ledoni Dolin & Lozouet, 2004 
† Zonaria mariaelisabethae Dolin 1991
† Zonaria pingata Landau and Groves 2011
† Zonaria pittorum Groves 1997
† Zonaria porcellus (Brocchi, 1814) 
† Zonaria praelatior Dolin 1991
† Zonaria pseudotumulus Landau and Groves 2011
† Zonaria shirleyae Dolin 1991
† Zonaria subexcisa Braun 1840
† Zonaria theresae Dolin 1991
† Zonaria travancorica Dey 1961
† Zonaria tumulus Heilprin 1886

Fossils of species within this genus have been found in sediments of Europe, United States, Venezuela, India, Pakistan and Somalia from Paleocene to Quaternary (age range: 61.7 to 0.012 million years ago).

See also 
 List of marine gastropod genera in the fossil record

References

External links
  Jousseaume, F. (1884). Division des Cypraeidae. Le Naturaliste. 6(52): 414-415

Cypraeidae
Gastropod genera
Paleocene gastropods
Neogene gastropods
Quaternary gastropods
Prehistoric gastropod genera
Gastropods described in 1884
Taxa named by Félix Pierre Jousseaume
Extant Selandian first appearances